Kathi Bennett (born January 31, 1963) is an American women's basketball coach. She is the former head coach of the Northern Illinois Huskies women's basketball team, a position she held from 2010 to 2015.

Biography
Bennett is the daughter of former University of Wisconsin–Green Bay Phoenix, Wisconsin Badgers and Washington State Cougars head coach Dick Bennett. Her brother is former NBA player and now Virginia Cavaliers head coach Tony Bennett. She graduated from Stevens Point Area Senior High School in Stevens Point, Wisconsin and attended the University of Wisconsin–Stevens Point and the University of Wisconsin–Green Bay, where she played on the women's basketball teams at both schools.

Coaching career
Bennett served as a head coach at Marycrest College during the 1988–89 season before taking the same position at the University of Wisconsin–Oshkosh. During her time there she led the team to the 1996 National Championship and was named Coach of the Year that season. From there she was the head coach with the Evansville Purple Aces and the Indiana Hoosiers. After spending a period of time away from coaching, she became an assistant coach with the Wisconsin Badgers before being hired to the head coaching position with the NIU Huskies.

References

1963 births
Living people
American women's basketball coaches
Basketball coaches from Wisconsin
Basketball players from Wisconsin
Evansville Purple Aces women's basketball coaches
Green Bay Phoenix women's basketball players
Indiana Hoosiers women's basketball coaches
Northern Illinois Huskies women's basketball coaches
People from Portage County, Wisconsin
Wisconsin Badgers women's basketball coaches
Wisconsin–Stevens Point Pointers women's basketball players